The 1923–24 Ljubljana Subassociation League was the fifth season of the Ljubljana Subassociation League. Ilirija won the league for the fifth time in a row, defeating I. SSK Maribor 5–0 in the final.

Celje subdivision

Ljubljana subdivision

Maribor subdivision

Semi-final

Final

References

External links
Football Association of Slovenia 

Slovenian Republic Football League seasons
Slovenia
2
Football
Football